This is a list of people who have served as Vice-Admiral of Northumberland.

 Reginald Beseley 1559–? (also Vice-Admiral of Yorkshire, 1559–1563, Vice-Admiral of Durham 1559–1563, Vice-Admiral of Cumberland 1559-1563 and Vice-Admiral of Westmorland 1559–?)
William Grey, 13th Baron Grey de Wilton 1561–1562
vacant
Thomas Foster 1563 jointly with
John Carvell 1563
Valentine Browne 1563–1564 
Francis Russell, 2nd Earl of Bedford 1564–1566
vacant
 Valentine Browne 1568–1574 (also Vice-Admiral of Durham 1568 and Vice-Admiral of Westmorland 1568–1574)
Henry Carey, 1st Baron Hunsdon 1575–1596 (also Vice-Admiral of Durham 1575–1596, Vice-Admiral of Cumberland 1586 – aft. 1587 and Vice-Admiral of Westmorland 1575 – aft. 1587)
Sir Richard Mompesson 1596–1604 (also Vice-Admiral of Durham 1596 and Vice-Admiral of Cumberland ?–1604 )
 Sir George Hume 1604–1611 (also Vice-Admiral of Cumberland 1604–1611)
Theophilus Howard, 2nd Earl of Suffolk 1611–1640 (also Vice-Admiral of Durham 1611-1640, Vice-Admiral of Cumberland 1611-1640 and Vice-Admiral of Westmorland 1622–1640)
Sir John Delaval 1640–1641 (also Vice-Admiral of Durham 1640)
vacant
Charles Howard, 1st Earl of Carlisle 1661–1685 (also Vice-Admiral of Durham 1661-1685, Vice-Admiral of Cumberland 1661-1685 and Vice-Admiral of Westmorland 1661-1685)
vacant
John Sheffield, 3rd Earl of Mulgrave 1687–1689 (also Vice-Admiral of Durham 1687–1689 and Vice-Admiral of Yorkshire 1659–1692) 
Richard Lumley, 1st Earl of Scarbrough 1689–1703  (also Vice-Admiral of Durham 1689–1702)
Mark Shafto 1703–1709
Sir John Delaval, 3rd Baronet 1709–1729
vacant
Hugh Percy, 1st Duke of Northumberland 1755–1786
Hugh Percy, 2nd Duke of Northumberland 1786–1817
vacant
Hugh Percy, 3rd Duke of Northumberland 1822–1847

References
Institute of Historical Research

Northumberland
Vice-Admirals
Military history of Northumberland